Mar Qardakh is a Christian school in Ankawa, a suburb of Erbil in Iraq. The school offers an International Baccalaureate program.

There are two main programs that are currently provided in Mar Qardakh school which are PYP and MYP.

When Mar Qardakh school was opened in 2011, it was the first international school in Ankawa. In 2014 Mar Qardakh school was authorized to offer  The International  baccalaureate.

References

External links
 Official web site

Schools in Iraq
Educational institutions established in 2011
2011 establishments in Iraq